Bournside is a village, which is now a suburb of Cheltenham in Gloucestershire, England.

References

Villages in Gloucestershire